Shakamak State Park is a state park in Indiana, United States.

Shakamak's main attraction is its fishing. Shakamak has several outdoor recreational activities such as swimming, hiking, paddle boating, row boating, camping, fishing. The park offers rentals for cabins and campsites and is located just  from Jasonville, Indiana. The park receives about 230,000 visitors annually.

The park is 1 of 14 Indiana State Parks that are in the path of totality for the 2024 solar eclipse, with the park experiencing 3 minutes and 53 seconds of totality.

History
Shakamak State Park was dedicated on September 3, 1928. The land was donated for a state park from the counties of Clay, Greene and Sullivan. The name "Shakamak" was chosen by the park's founders. The word is said to mean "river of the long fish" in the language of either the Delaware (Lenape) or Kickapoo Indians, and was said to be used by them to describe the nearby Eel River. The park founders simply adopted the name for the park long after any Delaware departed the area—well over 100 years before in 1819.

The first lake of Shakamak Park was created by the stopping up of a  sewer and additional lakes were added in following years (30 years later in the case of Lake Kickapoo). There were no lakes in the area prior to that time. It was purposely stocked with bass by Richard Lieber in May 1930, starting the park's fame for fishing in July 1932 after sufficient time had passed for the original bass to reproduce enough to populate the lake. Further development of the park also occurred with the help of the Civilian Conservation Corps (CCC). CCC Company 522 was located in the park from 1933 until 1942.

It was added to the National Register of Historic Places in 2000 as a national historic district.

Shakamak hosted many Mid-States AAU Championship Swim Meets, drawing a huge attendance. A platform and a 5 and 10 meter diving platform (called the "16" and "32" by local swimmers preferring to measure the heights approximately in feet) was created for the meets and remained open and in use by the general swimming public until the 1990s when Shakamak Lake was closed to swimming and a swimming pool was constructed.

References

External links 
 
 Indiana Department of Natural Resources' official Web page
 Shakamak, In. Resources

Civilian Conservation Corps in Indiana
Historic districts in Clay County, Indiana
Historic districts in Greene County, Indiana
Historic districts on the National Register of Historic Places in Indiana
National Register of Historic Places in Clay County, Indiana
Nature centers in Indiana
Parks on the National Register of Historic Places in Indiana
Protected areas established in 1929
Protected areas of Clay County, Indiana
Protected areas of Greene County, Indiana
Protected areas of Sullivan County, Indiana
State parks of Indiana
1929 establishments in Indiana